Xylem Tube EP is an EP by the English electronic music producer Richard D. James under the pseudonym of Aphex Twin, released in June 1992 by Apollo Records. It was his second release under the Aphex Twin alias. Xylem Tube EP was released exclusively on vinyl in June 1992. All the songs on this EP can be found on the 1994 compilation of early Aphex Twin material Classics, also released by R&S Records following his success on Warp Records. The EP consists of four unusual acid house songs, including the A-sides "Polynomial-C" which features complex arpeggiation, and "Tamphex", a repetitive dance track featuring a looping sample of a Tampax tampon advertisement.

Track listing

External links 
 Xylem Tube EP at Discogs.com

1992 EPs
Aphex Twin EPs